The  Diocese of Alessandria is a Roman Catholic ecclesiastical territory in Piedmont, northern Italy. It is a suffragan of the Archdiocese of Vercelli.

History

Foundation of the city
In 1168, in response to the aggression of Emperor Frederick Barbarossa, the leaders of Milan, Cremona and Piacenza, established a new town in order to discomfit Frederick's ally Pavia. The new city was to be made up of the inhabitants of the villages of Quargnento, Solero, Oviglio, Foro, Bergoglio, Rovereto, Marengo and Gamondio. Seeking support for their undertaking, they sent ambassadors to Pope Alexander III (1159–1181) in January 1170, announcing that they had named the new city Alessandria in his honor, and begging for his support. They offered the city to the Papacy to be forever the vassal of the Holy Roman Church. They set aside three jugera ("moggi") of land at the junction of the Quartiere di Marengo and the Quartiere di Gamondo, thanks to the generosity of the Marchesi del Bosco, for the construction of a "Chiesa maggiore" under the title of S. Pietro, who had been declared their patron saint two years earlier. The church, originally a collegiate church, was begun immediately, and was completed by 1178. It had been raised to the dignity of a cathedral church in 1175. It was small, too small for the growing population, and needed to be rebuilt. A new cathedral was under construction in 1289, and was completed in 1297.

Establishment of the diocese
Alessandria was made a diocese in 1175 by Pope Alexander III, with territory removed from the diocese of Acqui, Asti, Pavia, Tortona, and Milan. The diocese was declared to be a suffragan of the metropolitan of Milan.

In a Brief of 30 January 1176, Pope Alexander declared that he had selected Alessandria's first bishop, though he did so without any prejudice to the rights of the Chapter for the future to elect their bishop, just as the other suffragans of Milan did. The new bishop, Arduinus, died before he could be consecrated, and another candidate was substituted, who also did not receive an episcopal consecration. Archbishop Galdinus of Milan, who had been appointed to carry out the episcopal consecration, died on 18 April 1176.

On 28 May 1176, the Lombard League, of which Alessandria was a member, and of which Pope Alexander III was the nominal head, defeated Frederick Barbarossa in the Battle of Legnano, ending the emperor's fifth and last attempt to subdue the cities of Lombardy and Piedmont.

At the Third Lateran Council, held by Pope Alexander in March 1179, Archbishop Algesius and twelve of his suffragan bishops attended and subscribed the acts, including Bishop Ubertus of Aqui. No bishop of Alessandria was present.

On 18 July 1180, Pope Alexander III confirmed the election of Bishop Otto by the cathedral chapter of S. Pietro (which was already in existence and operating), with the agreement of the clergy and people, and also confirmed in their dignities Magister Hugo the Provost, Magister Cataldo the Archpriest, and Magister P(etrus?) the Cantor. He also confirmed the assignment of seven churches in the diocese for the use of the canons.

Dioceses of Alessandria and Acqui in conflict
Unhappy with the situation in Piedmont, however, and since Alexandria was already larger than Aqui, Pope Alexander in 1180 ordered that the seat of Aqui should be transferred to Alessandria. It was apparently intended that the bishop who was to reside in Alessandria was to govern both the dioceses, aeque personaliter. Archbishop Algisius of Milan wrote to the clergy and people of Alessandria that he was acting in accordance to a mandate from the pope to transfer the seat of the bishop of Aqui to the city of Alessandria. He also absolved them of the oath of fidelity which they had sworn to bishop-elect Otto. The clergy of Acqui objected to the loss of the presence of the bishop in their city, and the people of Alessandria refused to admit Bishop Ubertus of Acqui. Alessandria was therefore left without a bishop down to 1205. The Papacy was therefore faced with the need to sort out conflicts between the Chapter of Alessandria and the Chapter of Acqui. Pope Innocent III, therefore, in a letter of 12 May 1205, not only restated the terms of the bull of Pope Alexander III which transferred the seat of the bishop of Acqui to Alessandria, but also determined that there was to be a union of the two dioceses. He ordered Bishop Opizzo of Dertona and Canon Bongiovanni of Vercelli to carry out his mandate. Bishop Ugo Tornelli, who had been Bishop of Acqui since 1183, therefore was confirmed as bishop of Alessandria as well, and transferred his seat.

The diocese was suppressed in 1213 by Pope Innocent III, due to the support of the Alessandrians for Emperor Otto IV. The Church of Alessandria had also been refusing to pay the annual tax due to the Roman see, according to a letter of Innocent III of 4 June 1214.

It was restored on 10 May 1240 by Pope Gregory IX, with the bull "Regina Mater", as part of his strategy to defeat Frederick II. The territory of the diocese of Acqui was united with that of Alessandria until 1405, when Acqui again received its own bishop.

The French occupation
The armies of revolutionary France overran northern Italy in 1796. Brief puppet states were established. In 1802, Piedmont was directly annexed by the French state, and French-style départements were established. The territory of Alessandria became part of the Department of Marengo in 1802, and Alessandria itself was named its capital.

The diocese was suppressed in 1803, as part of the effort on the part of the Papacy to regularize the situation after the liquidation of the Cisalpine Republic (1799–1802), which had been created in northern Italy by General Napoleon Bonaparte, followed by the Italian Republic (Napoleonic) (1802–1805).

The diocese of Alessandria was re-established as an independent ecclesiastical entity in 1817, as a suffragan of the metropolitan archdiocese of Turin. It was vacant from 1854 to 1867.

List of Bishops

to 1500

1500 to 1800

since 1805

Parishes 
The diocese has 74 parishes (2020), all within the Piedmontese province of Alessandria.  In 2020, there was one priest for every 2,491 Catholics.

References

Books

Reference works
 p. 811. (Use with caution; obsolete)
  p. 83. (in Latin)
 p. 85.
 pp. 102–103.
 p. 77.
 p. 77.
 p. 75.

Studies

Christ, Anton (1891). "Unedierte Königs- und Papst- Urkunden," , in: Neues Archiv der Gesellschaft für Ältere Deutsche Geschichtskunde  Vol XVI (Hannover: Hahn 1891), pp. 135–168.
Fiaschini, G. (1970). "La fondazione della diocesi di Alessandria ed i contrasti con i vescovi acquesi," , in: Popolo e stato in Italia nell'età di Federico Barbarossa. Alessandria e la Lega Lombarda (Torino 1970), pp. 497–512.
Gasparolo, Francesco (1904), "La vecchia cattedrale d'Alessandria," , in: Rivista di storia, arte, archeologiadella provincia di Alessandria XIII (1904), pp. 187–204.
Ghilini, Girolamo (1666). [https://books.google.com/books?id=FGZjDIFVaUMC&pg=PA1 Annali di Alessandria], ouero Le cose accadute in essa città nel suo, e circonuicino territorio dall'anno dell'origine sua sino al 1659. . Milano: nella stamparia di Gioseffo Marelli al segno della Fortuna, 1666
Kehr, Paul Fridolin (1914). Italia pontificia : sive, Repertorium privilegiorum et litterarum a romanis pontificibus ante annum 1598 Italiae ecclesiis, monasteriis, civitatibus singulisque personis concessorum.  Vol. VI. pars ii. Berolini: Weidmann.

Livraghi, Roberto (ed.) (2011). Gli Inizi della Chiesa Alessandrina. . Alessandria: Diocesi di Alessandria, 2011.

Alessandria
Province of Alessandria
Alessandria
Religious organizations established in the 1170s
Alessandria